Holoterpna diagrapharia is a moth of the family Geometridae first described by Rudolf Püngeler in 1900. It is found in Transcaspia, Turkmenistan and northern Iran.

References

Moths described in 1900
Pseudoterpnini